Candice Didier (born 15 January 1988, in Strasbourg) is a French former competitive figure skater. She is the 2011 Winter Universiade champion and a three-time (2003, 2004, 2009) French national champion. She reached the free skate at five ISU Championships; her best results were 14th at the 2003 Junior Worlds in Ostrava and 13th at the 2009 Europeans in Helsinki.

Didier was coached by Carole Laguerre-Laplanche in Nancy and by Katia Krier in Paris. In 2012, she joined Diana Skotnická in Courbevoie. Didier retired from competition in 2014.

Programs

Competitive highlights

GP: Grand Prix; JGP: Junior Grand Prix

References

External links

 

1988 births
Living people
French female single skaters
Sportspeople from Strasbourg
Universiade medalists in figure skating
Universiade gold medalists for France
Competitors at the 2011 Winter Universiade
Competitors at the 2013 Winter Universiade